Frank McKenna (born Scotland) was a Scottish football wing forward who began his career in Scotland before playing eight seasons in the American Soccer League.

McKenna began his career with Vale of Leven F.C. in the Scottish Football League Second Division. In the spring of 1919, he briefly joined Bethlehem Steel of the National Association Football League  (NAFBL) after the completion of the 1918–1919 season. However, he left the team before the start of the 1919–1920 season. In May 1920, he rejoined Bethlehem Steel for the last few games of the season.  He then moved to Brooklyn Robins Dry Dock for the 1920–1921 season. The move to Robins paid off when Dry Dock took the 1921 National Challenge Cup title. In 1921, several teams from the NAFBL merged with teams from the Southern New England Soccer League to form the first American Soccer League. While Robins intended to move to the new league, the parent corporation, Todd Shipyards consolidated Robins with another of the company's teams, Tebo Yacht Basin F.C., to form the Todd Shipyards team. Therefore, McKenna spent the 1921–1922 season with Todd. McKenna went to his second National Challenge Cup, but was on the losing side this time. Following that loss, the company withdrew the team from the league and McKenna moved to Paterson F.C. where he scored a goal a game in both league and cup play. Once again, he went to the National Challenge Cup, winning his second title as he assisted on John Hemingsley tying goal in the 84th minute. McKenna finished the season with the Fall River Marksmen, one of the perennial powers in the ASL. During his three seasons in Fall River, McKenna won three league titles and yet another National Challenge Cup. In 1925, he began the season with the Marksmen but finished it with Indiana Flooring. In 1927, Indiana Flooring was renamed the New York Nationals. McKenna played sixteen games with the Nationals, then moved back to the Marksmen for two games before moving to Providence F.C. for three games. He finished his ASL career with J&P Coats in 1928–1929.

References

Scottish footballers
Association football forwards
Vale of Leven F.C. players
Bethlehem Steel F.C. (1907–1930) players
Robins Dry Dock players
Todd Shipyards (soccer team) players
Paterson F.C. (NAFBL) players
Fall River Marksmen players
Indiana Flooring players
New York Nationals (ASL) players
Providence Clamdiggers players
J&P Coats players
National Association Football League players
American Soccer League (1921–1933) players
Scottish expatriate footballers
Scottish expatriate sportspeople in the United States
Expatriate soccer players in the United States
Year of birth missing
Year of death missing